Bhaskar Roy (born 5 January 1993) is an Indian footballer who plays as a goalkeeper for Indian Super League club Mumbai City.

Career statistics

Club

Honours
Individual
I-League Best Goalkeeper (Gloden Glove): 2021–22

References

East Bengal and Mohammedan SC have shown interest in me: I-League’s best goalkeeper Bhaskar Roy on his dream season, ISL ambition, and more

1993 births
Living people
Footballers from Kolkata
Indian footballers
Association football goalkeepers
RoundGlass Punjab FC players
I-League players
Rajasthan United FC players